Leccinum variicolor is a species of bolete fungus in the genus Leccinum.

See also
List of Leccinum species

References

variicolor
Fungi described in 1969
Fungi of Europe
Taxa named by Roy Watling